Low Landing is a community in the Canadian province of Nova Scotia, located in the Region of Queens Municipality.

Low Landing is on the northern shore of Lake Rossignol.  This was, at one time, a summer community where residents of Caledonia, Nova Scotia and other nearby areas would go for the hot summer months.  However, when the lake was raised in 1929, the summer community was submerged and usage of the area was abandoned.

Low Landing, despite being marked on the Nova Scotia provincial road maps, is not a community.  There is a summer cottage compound that is privately owned by a local family.  There are no public facilities, stores or gasoline stations.

References
 Low Landing on Destination Nova Scotia

Communities in the Region of Queens Municipality
General Service Areas in Nova Scotia